Joanna Lynn Bernabei-McNamee (born 1975) is an American college basketball coach who is currently head women's basketball coach at Boston College.

Early life and education
Born Joanna Lynn Bernabei in Weirton, West Virginia, Bernabei-McNamee graduated from Weirton Madonna High School in 1993. She helped Weirton Madonna win a girls' basketball state championship and also lettered in tennis and track at the school.

After high school, she enrolled at West Liberty State College. A point guard, Bernabei-McNamee was a four-year all-WVIAC honoree and reached both 1,000 points and 1,000 rebounds in her collegiate career. In 1997, she graduated from West Liberty State with a bachelor's degree in exercise physiology.

West Liberty State College statistics
Source

Coaching career
Bernabei-McNamee began her coaching career at Eastern Kentucky in 1997 under Larry Joe Inman. She also completed a master's degree in sports administration at Eastern Kentucky in 1998.

In 1998, Bernabei-McNamee became head women's basketball coach and senior women's athletics administrator at Division II West Virginia Wesleyan College. At the time, she was the youngest college head coach in the U.S. Under Bernabei-McNamee, West Virginia Wesleyan went 18–10 (15–6 WVIAC). Bernabei-McNamee then spent the next two years back on Inman's staff at Eastern Kentucky.

Bernabei-McNamee joined Mike Carey's staff as assistant coach at West Virginia in 2001. Two years later, she became an assistant at Maryland under Brenda Frese and was part of the Maryland team that won the 2006 NCAA tournament. For the 2008–09 season, Bernabei-McNamee rejoined Carey at West Virginia as assistant coach.

In 2013, Bernabei-McNamee became head coach at the University of Pikeville, an NAIA school. In three seasons, she went 63–26 at Pikeville, including a 26–9 record and Final Four appearance in 2015–16.

On April 15, 2016, Albany hired Bernabei-McNamee to be women's basketball head coach.

Personal life
In 2004, Joanna Bernabei married Joseph McNamee. They have two children. From 2007 to 2008 and 2009 to 2013, she was a stay-at-home parent.

Head coaching record

References

1975 births
Living people
Albany Great Danes women's basketball coaches
American women's basketball coaches
Basketball coaches from West Virginia
Basketball players from West Virginia
Boston College Eagles women's basketball coaches
Eastern Kentucky Colonels women's basketball coaches
Eastern Kentucky University alumni
Maryland Terrapins women's basketball coaches
People from Weirton, West Virginia
Pikeville Bears coaches
West Liberty University alumni
West Virginia Mountaineers women's basketball coaches
West Virginia Wesleyan Bobcats and Lady Bobcats
Point guards